The Best of Boney M. is a compilation album of recordings by Boney M. released by BMG UK's midprice label Camden in 1997.

This compilation includes material from original albums Take the Heat off Me, Love for Sale and Nightflight to Venus. It also features edited versions of hits from 1980 compilation The Magic of Boney M. - 20 Golden Hits as well as tracks from remix album Greatest Hits Of All Times - Remix '88.

Track listing
"Rivers of Babylon" (Farian, Reyam) - 3:47
 1988 PWL remix from Greatest Hits Of All Times - Remix '88
"Ma Baker" (Farian, Jay, Reyam) - 4:37
 Original album/single version
"Rasputin" (Farian, Jay, Reyam) - 5:54
 Original album version, cold-start
"He Was a Steppenwolf" (Farian, Jay, Klinkhammer) - 6:53
 Original album version
"Daddy Cool" (Farian, Reyam) - 3:29
 Original album/single version
"Motherless Child" (Farian, Mitchell) - 4:59
 Original album version
"Brown Girl in the Ring" (Farian) - 4:04
 Original album/single version
"Sunny" (Bobby Hebb) - 3:17
 Edited version from The Magic of Boney M. - 20 Golden Hits
"No Woman, No Cry" (Ford, Bob Marley) - 3:38
 1988 PWL remix from Greatest Hits Of All Times - Remix '88
"Mary's Boy Child/Oh My Lord" (Farian, Jester Hairston) - 4:25
 1988 PWL remix from Greatest Hits Of All Times - Remix '88
"Hooray! Hooray! It's a Holi-Holiday" (Farian, Jay) - 3:12
 Edited version from The Magic of Boney M. - 20 Golden Hits. Original 7" mix released on the 2007 album Kalimba de Luna – 16 Happy Songs.
"Never Change Lovers in the Middle of the Night" (Björklund, Forsey, Jay) - 5:35
 Original album version
"Voodoonight" (Sgarbi) - 3:33
 Original album version
"Still I'm Sad" (McCarty, Samwell-Smith) - 4:36
 Original album version
"Nightflight to Venus" (Farian, Jay, Kawohl) - 4:49
 Original album version, fade-out
"Heart of Gold" (Neil Young) - 4:00
 Original album version
"Gotta Go Home" (Farian, Jay, Klinkhammer) - 4:40
 1988 PWL remix from Greatest Hits Of All Times - Remix '88

Personnel
 Liz Mitchell - lead vocals, backing vocals
 Marcia Barrett - lead vocals, backing vocals
 Frank Farian - lead vocals, backing vocals

Production
 Frank Farian - producer
 Pete Hammond - remixer

Certifications

References

External links
 Rate Your Music, detailed discography
 Discogs.com, detailed discography
 [ Allmusic, biography, discography etc.]

Albums produced by Frank Farian
1997 greatest hits albums
Boney M. compilation albums
Bertelsmann Music Group compilation albums